Raymond-Max Aubert (born 15 March 1947) is a French right-wing politician who was a deputy in the National Assembly of France during the mid-1990s. His constituency was in the department of Correze, the political base for both Jacques Chirac and Francois Hollande, and includes Tulle, Hollande's home town.

In 1993 he won a seat in the National Assembly, defeating Socialist deputy Francois Hollande, in the so-called 'blue wave' of French conservative MPs. In the 'red wave' of the French Socialist Party in the subsequent election in 1997, Hollande—who was later elected President of France in 2012—in turn defeated Aubert to re-take the seat.

References

Page on the National Assembly website

1947 births
Living people
French politicians
Chevaliers of the Légion d'honneur